This is a list of films produced in Taiwan ordered by year of release. For an alphabetical list of Taiwanese films see :Category:Taiwanese films

Pre 1970
 List of Taiwanese films before 1970

1970s
 List of Taiwanese films of the 1970s

1980s
 List of Taiwanese films of the 1980s

1990s
 List of Taiwanese films of the 1990s

2000s
 List of Taiwanese films of the 2000s

2010s
 List of Taiwanese films of the 2010s

2020s
 List of Taiwanese films of the 2020s

See also
 List of Taiwanese submissions for the Academy Award for Best Foreign Language Film
 Cinema of Taiwan

External links
 Taiwanese film at the Internet Movie Database.
 Searchable list of Taiwanese films at the Taiwan Cinema website. (English version.)
 Taiwanderful Taiwan Movie Guide — a community index of Taiwanese movies.